is a Japanese former professional baseball pitcher. Over his 16-year career, he played professional baseball in Japan, Canada, Taiwan, Mexico, and South Korea. He was used primarily as a starting pitcher.

Kobayashi graduated from famed baseball-focused PL Gakuen High School in Osaka, where he was a teammate of Kosuke Fukudome, who played for the Chicago Cubs in Major League Baseball.

Drafted in the fifth round of the 1997 draft by the Chiba Lotte Marines, Kobayashi played five seasons for their minor league "ni-gun" affiliate, from 1998 to 2002, but his 6.39 ERA prevented him from being promoted to the NPB club. Froom 2003 to 2005, he was on the "team staff" of the Chunichi Dragons, but never appeared in a game.

In 2006, Kobayashi left Japan for Canada to play for the Calgary Vipers of the independent North American League, going 0–2 with a 5.32 ERA for the season.

Returning to Japan in 2007, Kobayashi played for the Kagawa Olive Guyners of the independent Shikoku Island League. Appearing mostly as a reliever, he had a 2.59 ERA in just over 31 innings pitched.

Kobayashi had his greatest success in 2008–2009, playing for the Brother Elephants of the Chinese Professional Baseball League. In 2008 he compiled a 10–6	record, with a 2.66 ERA and 110 strikeouts. He was also the Player of the Month of October 2008. To top it off, he won the 2008 CPBL Gold Glove award.

Kobayashi moved on to Mexico in 2010–2010, first playing for the Chileros de Xalapa and Gallos de Santa Rosa in the Liga Invernal Veracruzana Mexican winter league, and then the Marineros de Ensenada of Liga Norte de México. He was selected to play in the 2011 LNM All-Star Game.

Kobayashi moved to South Korea in 2012 to pitch as a closer for the Goyang Wonders of the KBO Futures League. He played for the Wonders from 2012 to 2013, compiling an 8–5 record with a 2.95 ERA and 17 saves.

After his playing career was over, Kobayashi opened a baseball academy in Fukuoka.

Career statistics

NPB Eastern League (Japan)

North American League (Ind. Canadian)

Shikoku Island League (Ind. Japan)

CPBL (Taiwan)

Liga Invernal Veracruzana (Mex. Winter Baseball)

Liga Norte de México (Mex.)

KBO Futures League (Freedom Division)

See also
 Chinese Professional Baseball League
 Brother Elephants

References

External links
 
 

1979 births
Living people
Baseball people from Fukuoka Prefecture
Japanese expatriate baseball players in Canada
Japanese expatriate baseball players in Mexico
Japanese expatriate baseball players in Taiwan
Japanese expatriate baseball players in South Korea
Baseball pitchers
Chiba Lotte Marines players
Calgary Vipers players
Brother Elephants players